Mordellistena lefiniensis is a beetle in the genus Mordellistena of the family Mordellidae. It was described in 1967 by Ermisch.

References

lefiniensis
Beetles described in 1967